Niels Johannesen Loftesnæs (1 March 1789 – 31 May 1848) was a Norwegian farmer and soldier. He served as a representative at the Norwegian Constitutional Assembly.

Niels Johannesen Loftesnæs was born on the Loftesnes farm at Sogndal in Sogn og Fjordane, Norway. He was the oldest of seven siblings. In 1818, he moved to the Stenehjem farm in Sogndal parish where he spent the remainder of his life. He was married during 1814 to Berthe Olsdatter with whom he had eight children.

In 1814, Loftesnæs was in the military serving with the Musketeers in Sogndal Company (sogndalske kompani) division of the Bergenhus Infantry Regiment.
He represented Bergenhus Regiment at the Norwegian Constituent Assembly in 1814, together with Ole Elias Holck. At the Assembly, he belonged to the independence party.

References

1789 births
1848 deaths
People from Sogndal
Norwegian farmers
Norwegian Army personnel
Norwegian military personnel of the Napoleonic Wars
Fathers of the Constitution of Norway